Polygonothrips is a fossil genus of thrips in the family Phlaeothripidae.

Species
 †Polygonothrips apertosetosus

References

Phlaeothripidae
Thrips
Thrips genera